Marino Capicchioni (28 June 1895 – 19 October 1977) was an Italian musical instrument maker.

Biography 
Capicchioni was born in Santa Mustiola in the Republic of San Marino.  At an early age, he began working as a local carpenter as a cooper, as well as a woodcarver and furniture maker. He later developed an interest in instrument making and constructed several guitars. He completed his first violin when he was 24.

In 1929 he permanently established himself in Rimini where he opened his own workshop. He participated in numerous exhibitions and competitions all over Italy and was praised and recognized for his talent: in 1931 he won the gold medal at the Padua Exposition, and in 1937 he received an honorable mention and a silver medal for his quintet exhibited in the Cremona competition during the Stradivari Bicentenary.

The Vannes Universal Dictionary of Violinmakers quotes that in 1948 Capicchioni had already made 350 violins, 10 violas, and 20 violoncellos.

In the middle of the 1940s, his son Mario began working with him and shared in his business until the Master's death.

The Republic of San Marino dedicated a square to Marino Capicchioni and erected a monument by the sculptor Marina Busignani Reffi in his honor.

Analysis of Capicchioni's work 
An overall analysis of Capicchioni's work shows two distinct periods: one to the 1920s and 1930s and the second "golden period" beginning in the 1940s, the era which brought him fame.

His work of the 1920s and 1930s is distinguished by his continued research for technical and stylistic solutions: the workmanship is good but his distinct personality does not emerge. Although he was inspired by the classical models of Stradivari and Guarneri.

In the golden period, the master succeeded in giving a personal influence to his work, a quality which can be recognized almost unmistakably. He always used material of excellent quality and to accentuate the flame of the maple, he developed a special technique for treating the instrument "in the white". When he varnished his instruments, he attempted to age them slightly by accentuating the grain of the spruce on the belly. The varnish used was generally a golden yellow, but one can also find instruments with lively red coloring. Capicchioni's work was already quite popular in the early 1960s and his instruments are still sought after today for their excellent sound.  He died in Rimini, aged 82.

One of his quartets is on permanent display at the Stradivari Museum of Cremona.

Some musicians that have owned Capicchioni instruments 
in alphabetical order:

Alberto Sanna violin of 1927
Alessandra Sonia Romano violin of 1951
Alessandro Moccia violin of 1941
Alfredo Cicoria cello of 1963
Andrea Castagna violin of 1938
Anna Maria Cotogni violin of 1955
Antonio De Lorenzi violin of 1943
Arrigo Serato violin of 1946
Carlo Fabiano violin of 1955
Christian Joseph Saccon violin of 1953
Clara Fuchs viola of 1963
David Oistrach violin of 1962
Duilio Galfetti violin of 1949
Elisa Pegreffi two violin of 1942 and 1943
Fabrizio Zoffoli violin of 1962
Felix Ayo violin of 1956
Florence Ohlberg viola of 1950
Franco Gulli violin of 1946
Franco Rossi cello of 1953
Giuliano Carmignola violin of 1947
Giuseppe Laffranchini cello of 1952
John McCarthy viola of 1950
Luca Fanfoni violin of 1955
Luciano Capicchioni violin of 1974
Luigi Alberto Bianchi violin of 1952 and a viola of 1965
Marcel Tufigno violin of 1966
Marianne Chen cello of 1946
Massimo Paris viola of 1959
Mstislav Rostropovich
Nazareno Cicoria cello of 1963
Paolo Borciani two violins of 1942 and 1943
Pierluigi Capicchioni violin of 1974
Piero Farulli viola of 1944
Pina Carmirelli three violins of 1941,1954 and 1956
Roberto Tarenzi violin of 1944
Rodolfo Bonucci violin of 1939
Salvatore Accardo violin of 1942
Szymon Krzeszowiec violin of 1942
Vincenzo Schembri viola of 1953
Walter Zagato violin of 1963
Wim Janssen viola of 1952
Yehudi Menuhin violin of 1961

References 

Italian luthiers
1977 deaths
1895 births
Sammarinese emigrants to Italy
People from Rimini